To Chi Ka is a fusion album by Kazumi Watanabe. It was recorded and mixed in March 1980 during a very prolific period for Watanabe and then released in May 1980. The album features some of the most acclaimed jazz and rock musicians; part of them will follow Watanabe in other projects, too. The album offers many improvisational tracks.

Track listing 
 "Liquid Fingers" 4:57
 "Black Canal" 6:46
 "To Chi Ka" 3:35
 "Cokumo Island" 8:52
 "Unicorn" 4:45
 "Don't Be Silly" 5:42
 "Sayonara" 5:29
 "Manhattan Flu Dance" 6:03

Personnel 
 Kazumi Watanabe – guitars
 Mike Mainieri – vibraphone
 Kenny Kirkland – piano
 Marcus Miller – bass
 Tony Levin – fretless bass
 Peter Erskine – drums
 Steve Jordan – percussion
 Sammy Figueroa – percussion
 Warren Bernhardt – keyboards
 Michael Brecker – tenor saxophone on #4

Musical Style 
The music of To Chi Ka reflects a fusion of jazz, rock, and traditional Japanese music. The album features a diverse range of instruments, including koto, shakuhachi, and taiko drums, as well as synthesizers and electric guitars. Watanabe's guitar work draws from both Western and Japanese musical traditions, incorporating elements of rock, jazz, and traditional Japanese music.

References 

1980 albums
Kazumi Watanabe albums